Saprolegniaceae is a family of freshwater mould. James Ellis Humphrey (1861-1897), an American Mycologist did significant work on this family.

Taxonomy
Saprolegniaceae contains the following genera, species, and subspecies.

 Achlya 
 Achlya ambisexualis 
 Achlya americana 
 Achlya androgyna 
 Achlya apiculata 
 Achlya aquatica 
 Achlya bisexualis 
 Achlya bonariensis 
 Achlya caroliniana 
 Achlya catenulata 
 Achlya colorata 
 Achlya conspicua 
 Achlya crenulata 
 Achlya debaryana 
 Achlya dubia 
 Achlya flagellata 
 Achlya glomerata 
 Achlya heterosexualis 
 Achlya hypogyna 
 Achlya intricata 
 Achlya klebsiana 
 Achlya oblongata 
 Achlya oligacantha 
 Achlya orion 
 Achlya ornata 
 Achlya oviparvula 
 Achlya papillosa 
 Achlya primoachlya 
 Achlya prolifera 
 Achlya proliferoides 
 Achlya racemosa 
 Achlya radiosa 
 Achlya recurva 
 Achlya rodrigueziana 
 Achlya sparrowii 
 Achlya spiralis 
 Achlya stellata 
 Achlya treleaseana 
 Aplanes 
 Aplanes androgynus 
 Aplanes treleaseanus 
 Aplanopsis 
 Aplanopsis terrestris 
 Brevilegnia 
 Brevilegnia bispora 
 Brevilegnia gracilis 
 Brevilegnia longicaulis 
 Brevilegnia macrospora 
 Brevilegnia megasperma 
 Brevilegnia minutandra 
 Brevilegnia unisperma 
 Brevilegnia unisperma var. delica  
 Brevilegnia variabilis 
 Calyptralegnia 
 Calyptralegnia achlyoides 
 Dictyuchus 
 Dictyuchus monosporus 
 Dictyuchus pseudodictyon 
 Dictyuchus sterilis 
 Geolegnia 
 Geolegnia helicoides 
 Isoachlya 
 Isoachlya toruloides 
 Newbya 
 Newbya dichotoma 
 Newbya spinosa 
 Phragmosporangium 
 Phragmosporangium uniseriatum 
 Protoachlya 
 Protoachlya paradoxa 
 Protoachlya polysporus 
 Pythiopsis 
 Pythiopsis cymosa 
 Pythiopsis humphreyana 
 Pythiopsis intermedia 
 Pythiopsis irregularis 
 Pythiopsis terrestris 
 Saprolegnia 
 Saprolegnia aenigmatica 
 Saprolegnia anisospora 
 Saprolegnia anomalies 
 Saprolegnia asterophora 
 Saprolegnia australis 
 Saprolegnia bulbosa 
 Saprolegnia delica 
 Saprolegnia diclina 
 Saprolegnia eccentrica 
 Saprolegnia ferax 
 Saprolegnia cf. ferax 
 Saprolegnia furcata 
 Saprolegnia hypogyna 
 Saprolegnia lapponica 
 Saprolegnia litoralis 
 Saprolegnia longicaulis 
 Saprolegnia megasperma 
 Saprolegnia milanezii 
 Saprolegnia mixta 
 Saprolegnia monilifera 
 Saprolegnia monoica 
 Saprolegnia multispora 
 Saprolegnia oliviae 
 Saprolegnia parasitica 
 Saprolegnia polymorpha 
 Saprolegnia racemosa 
 Saprolegnia salmonis 
 Saprolegnia semihypogyna 
 Saprolegnia subterranea 
 Saprolegnia terrestris 
 Saprolegnia torulosa 
 Saprolegnia truncata 
 Saprolegnia turfosa 
 Saprolegnia unispora 
 Scoliolegnia 
 Scoliolegnia asterophora 
 Sommerstorffia Arnaudov 1923 
 Sommerstorffia spinosa Arnaudov 
 Thraustotheca 
 Thraustotheca clavata 
 Thraustotheca terrestris

References

Heterokont families
Saprolegniales
Taxa described in 1884
Taxa named by Friedrich Traugott Kützing